The Meadows House is a historic house located at 508 North Bonner Street in Ruston, Louisiana.

Built in c.1900, the house is a -story frame residence with Queen Anne Revival and Eastlake elements. The present house is the enlargement of a previous smaller residence dating to c.1890. The building features an Eastlake front gallery connecting the two projecting porches on each side.

The house was listed on the National Register of Historic Places on October 8, 1992.

See also
 National Register of Historic Places listings in Lincoln Parish, Louisiana

References

Houses on the National Register of Historic Places in Louisiana
Houses completed in 1900
Queen Anne architecture in Louisiana
Lincoln Parish, Louisiana
National Register of Historic Places in Lincoln Parish, Louisiana